William Parker Morrell, CBE (20 November 1899 – 27 April 1986) was a notable New Zealand historian and university professor. He was born in Auckland, New Zealand on 20 November 1899.

His father was William John Morrell, Chancellor of Otago University, Dunedin.

References

1899 births
1986 deaths
20th-century New Zealand historians
Writers from Auckland
People educated at Otago Boys' High School
University of Otago alumni
Academic staff of the University of Otago
New Zealand Commanders of the Order of the British Empire